"Nice and Slow" is a song performed by Jamaican reggae and disco musician Jesse Green, released in 1976. It was a No. 1 hit in Belgium and the Netherlands, and also reached the top 20 charts of Austria and the United Kingdom.

Weekly charts

References

1976 songs
1976 singles
Dutch Top 40 number-one singles
Ultratop 50 Singles (Flanders) number-one singles
Disco songs
EMI Records singles